William Murray of Tullibardine (died 1513) was a Scottish landowner and courtier.

He was a son of William Murray and Katherine Gray, a daughter of Andrew, Lord Gray.

His lands were at Tullibardine and Gask. In the first years of the 16th-century, he, his father, and younger brother Andrew Murray, rebuilt Tullibardine Chapel.

In 1507 and 1508, James IV of Scotland held tournaments of the Wild Knight and the Black Lady. For the Arthurian theme, the "Wild Knight" was accompanied by wild men. Murray sent sent hart horns and goat skins from Tullibardine to Edinburgh for their costumes.

In May 1508, during the Black Lady tournament, he took part in a shooting match with James IV and Duncan Campbell. 

William Murray is said to have been killed at the battle of Flodden in 1513.

Marriage and family
William Murray married Margaret Stewart, a daughter of John Stewart, 1st Earl of Atholl. Their children included:
 William Murray of Tullibardine (died 1562), who married Katherine Campbell
 Margaret Murray, who married Thomas Stewart of Grandtully
 Helen Murray, who married Alexander Seton of Parbroath

References

1513 deaths
Court of James IV of Scotland